Sabouraud agar or Sabouraud dextrose agar (SDA) is a type of agar growth medium containing peptones. It is used to cultivate dermatophytes and other types of fungi, and can also grow filamentous bacteria such as Nocardia. It has utility for research and clinical care.

It was created by, and is named after, Raymond Sabouraud in 1892. In 1977 the formulation was adjusted by Chester W. Emmons when the pH level was brought closer to the neutral range and the dextrose concentration lowered to support the growth of other microorganisms. The acidic pH (5.6) of traditional Sabouraud agar inhibits bacterial growth.

Typical composition

Sabouraud agar is commercially available and typically contains:
 40 g/L dextrose
 10 g/L peptone
 20 g/L agar
 pH 5.6

Medical Use
Clinical laboratories can use this growth medium to diagnose and further speciate fungal infections, allowing medical professionals to provide appropriate treatment with antifungal medications. Histoplasma and other fungal causes of atypical pneumonia can be grown on this medium.

References

Microbiological media